The 2018 African Youth Olympic Futsal Qualifying Tournament was an international youth futsal competition organised by the Confederation of African Football (CAF) as qualifying for the futsal tournament at the 2018 Summer Youth Olympics in Buenos Aires, to determine which under-18 national team from Africa qualify for the boys' tournament.

Players born on or after 1 January 2000 were eligible to compete in the tournament.

Teams
A total of eight (out of 54) CAF member national teams entered the qualifying rounds.

Notes
Teams in bold qualified for the Olympics.

Format
Qualification ties were played on a home-and-away two-legged basis. If the aggregate score was tied after the second leg, the away goals rule would be applied, and if still tied, the penalty shoot-out (no extra time) would be used to determine the winner.

Schedule
The schedule of the qualifying rounds was as follows.

Bracket
The winner of the third round qualified for the 2018 Summer Youth Olympics boys' futsal tournament.

First round

|}

Mozambique won on walkover after Ethiopia withdrew.

Egypt won on walkover after Sudan withdrew.

Morocco won on walkover after Equatorial Guinea withdrew.

Angola won 11–4 on aggregate.

Second round

|}

Egypt won 10–3 on aggregate.

Angola won 5–4 on aggregate.

Third round
Winner qualified for 2018 Summer Youth Olympics boys' futsal tournament.

|}

Egypt won 9–4 on aggregate.

Qualified teams for Youth Olympics
The following team from CAF qualified for the 2018 Summer Youth Olympics boys' futsal tournament.

Notes
Since teams from the same association cannot play in both the Youth Olympics boys' and girls' tournaments, if teams from the same association qualify for both tournaments, they must nominate their preferred qualification team, and the runners-up will qualify instead if the winners are not nominated.
As participation in team sports (Futsal, Beach handball, Field hockey, and Rugby sevens) are limited to one team per gender for each National Olympic Committee (NOC), the participating teams of the 2018 Youth Olympics futsal tournament will be confirmed by mid-2018 after each qualified NOC confirms their participation and any unused qualification places are reallocated.

References

External links
African Preliminaries Futsal Youth Olympic Games-BUENOS AIRES 2018, CAFonline.com

Caf Boys
2018 in futsal
2018 in youth association football
Futsal Youth Olympic Qualifying Tournament
February 2018 sports events in Africa
March 2018 sports events in Africa
April 2018 sports events in Africa